The Nels Cline Trio were a group of free jazz musicians active in Santa Monica, California in the 1990s, led by Nels Cline.

Discography
Lady Speed Stick 7" (1991)
Silencer (1992)
Beardism/WDTCHC 7" (1992)
Pants 7" (1994)
Ground (1995)
Chest (1996)
Sad (1998)
Hold It Under a Faucet 7" (2002)

American jazz ensembles from California
Free jazz ensembles